A Statement of Recommended Practice (SORP), issued in the UK and Ireland, provides recommendations on financial reporting that supplement official accounting standards. SORPs are developed and issued by industry and sector bodies that must meet criteria set by the FRC.

SORPs are developed in accordance with current financial reporting practice and must not conflict with accounting standards or financial reporting objectives.

References 

Financial statements